Tony may refer to:

People and fictional characters
 Tony (given name), including a list of people and fictional characters
 Gregory Tony (born 1978), American law enforcement officer
 Motu Tony (born 1981), New Zealand international rugby league footballer
 Tony (footballer, born 1983), full name Tony Heleno da Costa Pinho, Brazilian football defensive midfielder
 Tony (footballer, born 1986), full name Antônio de Moura Carvalho, Brazilian football attacking midfielder
 Tony (footballer, born 1989), full name Tony Ewerton Ramos da Silva, Brazilian football right-back

Film, theater and television
 Tony Awards, a Broadway theatre honor
 Tony (1982 film), an Indian Kannada-language film
 Tony (2009 film), a British horror film directed by Gerard Johnson
 Tony (2013 film), an Indian Kannada-language thriller film 
 "Tony" (Skins series 1), an episode of British comedy-drama Skins
 "Tony" (Skins series 2), an episode of Skins

Music
 Tony T., stage name of British singer, rapper and DJ Neal Antone Dyer (born 1971)
 Tony (album), a 1957 album by Tony Bennett
 "T.O.N.Y.", a 2008 song by Solange Knowles

Other uses
 Kawasaki Ki-61, a Japanese World War II fighter aircraft code-named "Tony"
 Tony, Wisconsin, a village in the United States

See also
 
 Toni (disambiguation)
 Tonie, Kraków, a neighborhood of the city of Kraków, Poland
 Toney (disambiguation)
 Tonny (disambiguation)
 Torny Pedersen